is a Japanese video artist, animation director and motion graphics designer. He also works as VJ Cotobuki with Naoki Nagayasu.

Biography 
Yoshizaki was born in Tokyo, Japan.  At the age of 16, he was deeply impressed by Kōji Morimoto's MV "Extra" (music by Ken Ishii), which inspired him to work in animation.  As a high school student, he started working in Gainax under guidance of Hiroyuki Yamaga.  He then entered Tama Art University and started working as a VJ in nightclubs all around Tokyo while studying animation under Kōji Morimoto at Studio 4°C.  After graduation, he became a freelance motion graphics artist and art director, mainly for animated MV and PV.  In 2011, for making Clammbon's Kanade Dance MV, he was selected as one of the top 100 video artists of the year on a magazine published by BNN Shinsha, Japan.  In 2013, he created the first original animated music video "ME!ME!ME!" in collaboration with TeddyLoid and Daoko.  It was made as the 3rd episode of Japan Animator Expo project, which has going viral and achieved the highest number of views among all 36 episodes in the project.  After working as a freelance art director for 18 years, he joined Khara in 2016.

Selected works

Television series
 AKB0048: Next Stage (2013; Opening director and storyboard artist)
 Macross Frontier (2008; motion graphics)

OVAs
 Macross Zero (2003-2004; CG)
 Gundam Evolve (2005; CG (episode 13))
 Yozakura Quartet: Hana no Uta (2013; opening director, storyboard artist, and motion graphics)
 Yozakura Quartet: Tsuki ni Naku (2013-2014; opening director and storyboard artist)
 Psycho-Pass 2 (2014; subtitle design)

Films 
 Evangelion: 3.0 You Can (Not) Redo (2012; Motion graphics director and design works)
 The Dragon Dentist (2017; Unit director and storyboard artist)
 Evangelion: 3.0+1.0 Thrice Upon a Time (2021; Storyboard artist)
 Adam by Eve: A Live in Animation (2022; Eve's song Bouto (Mob) MV Director)

Music videos
 ME!ME!ME! by TeddyLoid feat. Daoko  (2014; director, unit director, editor, compositor, storyboard artist, visual effects, and original creator)
  ME!ME!ME! CHRONIC by Daoko feat. TeddyLoid (2015; director, storyboard artist, and original creator)
 GIRL by Daoko (2015; director, storyboard artist, and original creator)
 Sakura Nagashi by Hikaru Utada (2016; director)
The Asahi Shimbun by Motohiro Onishi (2016; director)

Other MV
 Believe by i-dep (2007; Director)
 Room #204 by Jazztronik (2009; Director)
 KANADE DANCE by Clammbon (2010; Director)

Video games 
 Ace Combat Infinity (2013; Cinematics and motion graphics)
 Ace Combat 7: Skies Unknown (2019; Cinematics director)

Commercials 
 HAL/ College of Technology & Design (2016, 2020; Director)

References

External links
 (Japanese)
 (Japanese)

1980 births
Living people
Anime directors
Japanese animators
Japanese film directors
Japanese animated film directors
Japanese music video directors
Japanese video artists
People from Tokyo